Vinson Allen Collins (March 1, 1867 - July 5, 1966) was a Texas politician.

Early life and education
Vinson Allen Collins was born in Hardin County, Texas near Honey Island on March 1, 1867. He was the seventh child of Warren Collins and Eboline Valentine Collins. The Collins family had moved to Texas from Mississippi in 1854.

He graduated from Sam Houston State Normal College (now part of Sam Houston State University) in 1893.

Career
He started his career as a schoolteacher in Big Sandy Independent School District in Polk County, Texas while studying the Law. He was admitted to the State Bar of Texas in 1901 and opened a law practice in Beaumont, Texas.

He served three terms in the Texas Senate as a Democrat. He sponsored the law that established a workers' compensation system in Texas and established the Texas Industrial Accident Board, and the law restricting work to eight hours a day. In a race for the United States House of Representatives, he was defeated by Martin Dies, Sr. In 1924, his campaign for Governor of Texas against Felix D. Robertson and Miriam A. "Ma" Ferguson was unsuccessful and Ferguson was elected.

He was a supporter of prohibition and of women’s suffrage.

Personal life
He was married twice, first to Elizabeth (Lizzie) Hopkins and later to Nannie Kuykendall. He had six children. Carr Collins, Sr., son of V.A. Collins and Lizzie Hopkins, was an insurance executive and philanthropist.

Death
Collins died in Dallas, Texas on July 5, 1966 and is buried in Livingston, Texas.

References

1867 births
1966 deaths
People from Hardin County, Texas
Sam Houston State University alumni
Texas lawyers
Democratic Party Texas state senators